Ian DeWitt Lockhart (born June 25, 1967 in Nassau, Bahamas) is a Bahamian former professional basketball player. Listed at 6 ft 8 in (203 cm) and 240 lb (109 kg) he played as a small forward.

College career
Lockhart played college basketball for the University of Tennessee Volunteers in the Southeastern Conference of the NCAA Division I from 1986 to 1990.

Professional career
After going undrafted in the 1990 NBA Draft he was signed by the Phoenix Suns in September 1990; however, he only played 2 minutes in a solitary November 1990 appearance, scoring 4 points.

Released by the Suns, he moved to Puerto Rico to play in the Baloncesto Superior Nacional (BSN). He would play in the country for 15 seasons, including 11 consecutive seasons from 1990 to 2002, most notably for the Piratas de Quebradillas. In 2000, Lockhart won the BSN Most Valuable Player award.

Playing concurrently in Europe, Lockhart spent time in the French, Greek, Spanish, and Italian leagues.

In the Italian Lega Basket Serie A, he played for Virtus Roma, Mabo Pistoia—with whom he led the league in rebounding in 1997–98, Lineltex Imola, Roseto and Teramo Basket. He also played in Greece for Pagrati, Near East and Ampelokipoi Athens.

References

External links
NBA profile  Retrieved on June 10, 2015
Lega Basket Serie A profile Retrieved on June 10, 2015 
Ligue Nationale de Basket profile Retrieved on June 10, 2015 
RealGM profile Retrieved on June 10, 2015

1967 births
Living people
Ampelokipoi B.C. players
Andrea Costa Imola players
Bahamian expatriate basketball people in the United States
Bahamian men's basketball players
Baloncesto Superior Nacional players
Cholet Basket players
HTV Basket players
Lega Basket Serie A players
National Basketball Association players from the Bahamas
Near East B.C. players
Olimpia Basket Pistoia players
Pagrati B.C. players
Pallacanestro Virtus Roma players
Phoenix Suns players
Piratas de Quebradillas players
Power forwards (basketball)
Roseto Sharks players
Sportspeople from Nassau, Bahamas
Tennessee Volunteers basketball players
Teramo Basket players
Undrafted National Basketball Association players